Pietro Rossi (23 January 1738 in Florence – 21 December 1804 in Pisa) was an Italian scientist and entomologist.

Career
Rossi's academic career was conducted at the University of Pisa, where he attained a doctorate in philosophy and medicine in 1759. He was then made a professor of logic in 1763, a position he held until 1801, when he finally received the chair for natural history with the special field "insectology", making him the world's first professor of entomology. His publications, particularly Fauna etrusca (1790) and Mantissa insectorum (1792), are considered pioneer achievements of entomology and still possess scientific validity in the fields of taxonomy and biological nomenclature. Parts of his collection were once in the possession of Johann Christian Ludwig Hellwig in Braunschweig; these are now in the Natural History Museum of Berlin. In 1793, he was elected a foreign member of the Royal Swedish Academy of Sciences. After his death, the Museo entomologico Pietro Rossi was integrated into the Museo Civico di Storia Naturale de Milan in Milan.

References
 R. Poggi/B. Baccetti: Pietro Rossi, naturalista toscano del '1700. In: Accademici e qualche precursore, UN sguardo retrospettivo sull'entomologia italiana. Accademia Nazionale Italiana di Entomologia, Celebrazioni by i 50 anni di attività, Florenz 2001, p. 7-38

External links
BHL  Scan of  Fauna Etrusca 
BHL Scan of   Mantissa insectorum 
Augusto Vigna Taglianti, L'entomologia nella scienza italiana, con particolare riguardo alla Accademia Nazionale delle Scienze detta dei XL (Vortrag vom 13. Nov. 2003)

1738 births
1804 deaths
Scientists from Florence
Italian entomologists
18th-century Italian botanists
Members of the Royal Swedish Academy of Sciences